Sengkang Public Library is a public library owned by the National Library Board situated inside Compass One in Sengkang New Town, and it occupies levels 3 and 4. It is near Sengkang Bus Interchange and the Sengkang MRT/LRT station.

History

Originally called Sengkang Community Library, it was officially opened on 30 November 2002 by Rear-Admiral (NS) Teo Chee Hean, Senior Minister for Education and Second Minister of Defence, and Member of Parliament for Pasir Ris GRC as Singapore’s first DIY library. It used to occupy only level 4 of Compass Point (now Compass One). Its name was changed to Sengkang Public Library in 2008. It was staffed by one librarian and had a DIY concept, in which customers carry out simple transactions on their own. They could also communicate with another librarian in another library using a telephone at the library. When the population of the Sengkang and Punggol estates increased, the library was converted into a full-service library with a full-time staff. It underwent a renovation in 2013 and the children's section was improved. It was then closed for major upgrading on 18 October 2015 and reopened on 18 March 2017 by Minister for Communications and Information Yaacob Ibrahim who officiated the reopening ceremony. The library now occupies levels 3 and 4 of Compass One with 18% more space, up from the original 1809 m2. It now has a new 'tween' section.

Layout
Consisting of two levels, the 2136 m2 library serves the residents in the Sengkang, Jalan Kayu, Punggol Central and Punggol South areas. The lower level of the library contains the adult and digital collections, while the upper level contains the children's collection, magazines, and adult fiction.

Lower  
Adult nonfiction
Digital newspapers and archives

Upper 
Adult fiction
Magazines
Adult magazines
Children’s magazines
Children’s nonfiction
Children’s fiction
Comics
Audio Visuals
Book drop

See also
List of libraries in Singapore

References

External links
National Library Board

Libraries in Singapore
Sengkang
Sengkang Town Centre
2002 establishments in Singapore
Libraries established in 2002